The Beaver Meadow Brook Archeological Site is a prehistoric Native American village or camp site in New Hampshire. Located near Sewall's Falls on the west bank of the Merrimack River, the site includes evidence of occupation during Middle and Late Archaic periods, as well as during the Woodland precontact period. Finds at the site include a stone axe and numerous tools for working stone, as well as projectile points and bone fragments. The site also has several hearths, evidence of significant occupation during the Woodland period.

The site was listed on the National Register of Historic Places in 1989.

See also
National Register of Historic Places listings in Merrimack County, New Hampshire

References

Archaeological sites on the National Register of Historic Places in New Hampshire
Concord, New Hampshire
National Register of Historic Places in Concord, New Hampshire
Native American history of New Hampshire